Ahmed Mohamed Aden, also known as Qeybe or Qaybe, was the foreign minister of Somalia from 1990 until 1991. He also became Somalia's Ambassador to the United States, Soviet Union, Britain, and the United Nations. He was the speaker of House of Representatives of Somaliland from 1997 to 2005.

Adan Qeybe was born in Yemen in the 1930s, he lived with his father in Aden and he attended Primary and Secondary school in Aden. He was 84 years when he died in Hargeisa.

References 

Speakers of the House of Representatives (Somaliland)
Government ministers of Somalia
Somaliland politicians
Ambassadors of Somalia
1930s births
Year of birth uncertain
2013 deaths
People from Las Anod